2009–10 Moldovan National Division season is the 4th Moldovan National Division season in the history of FC Iskra-Stali Rîbniţa.

Season squad

National Division results

European cups

References 

Moldovan football clubs 2009–10 season
FC Iskra-Stali seasons